Joachim Magnussen (born 18 July 1987) is a Norwegian footballer who plays as a forward for Hødd in the First Division. He has previously played for Hønefoss in Tippeligaen.

Ahead of the 2013 season, Magnussen returned to Hødd after playing for Hønefoss for two seasons.

Career statistics

References 

1987 births
Living people
Sportspeople from Ålesund
Sportspeople from Møre og Romsdal
Norwegian footballers
Association football forwards
IL Hødd players
Hønefoss BK players
Norwegian First Division players
Eliteserien players